Duruköy is a village in the İdil District of Şırnak Province in Turkey. The village is populated by Kurds of the Hesinan tribe and had a population of 1,001 in 2021.

The hamlet of Çayırlı is attached to Duruköy.

References 

Villages in İdil District
Kurdish settlements in Şırnak Province